Statistics of Emperor's Cup in the 1984 season.

Overview
It was contested by 32 teams, and Yomiuri won the championship.

Results

1st round
Nissan Motors 6–0 Mazda Auto Hiroshima
NTT Kinki 0–1 Mazda
Kyushu Sangyo University 1–2 Tanabe Pharmaceuticals
Fukuoka University 1–1 (PK 4–3) Mitsubishi Motors
Honda 2–2 (PK 5–4) Tsukuba University
Toyota Motors 2–3 Hitachi
Kokushikan University 3–2 Sapporo University
Fukushima FC 0–6 Furukawa Electric
Yomiuri 2–1 Osaka University of Health and Sport Sciences
Nippon Steel 1–4 Teijin
Nippon Kokan 0–1 Matsushita Electric
Nissei Plastic Industry 0–3 Yanmar Diesel
Fujita Industries 4–0 Sumitomo Metals
Aichi Gakuin University 3–1 TDK
Seino Transportation 1–3 Toshiba
Kofu Club 0–3 Yamaha Motors

2nd round
Nissan Motors 5–2 Mazda
Tanabe Pharmaceuticals 1–0 Fukuoka University
Honda 1–0 Hitachi
Kokushikan University 0–1 Furukawa Electric
Yomiuri 5–0 Teijin
Matsushita Electric 0–2 Yanmar Diesel
Fujita Industries 4–0 Aichi Gakuin University
Toshiba 0–2 Yamaha Motors

Quarterfinals
Nissan Motors 2–1 Tanabe Pharmaceuticals
Honda 0–1 Furukawa Electric
Yomiuri 2–0 Yanmar Diesel
Fujita Industries 0–1 Yamaha Motors

Semifinals
Nissan Motors 0–0 (PK 3–5) Furukawa Electric
Yomiuri 2–1 Yamaha Motors

Final

Furukawa Electric 0–2 Yomiuri
Yomiuri won the championship.

References
 NHK

Emperor's Cup
Emperor's Cup
1985 in Japanese football